Agrothrips is a genus of thrips in the family Phlaeothripidae.

Species
 Agrothrips arenicola
 Agrothrips dimidiatus
 Agrothrips omani
 Agrothrips pallidus
 Agrothrips priesneri
 Agrothrips tantillus
 Agrothrips tenebricosus

References

Phlaeothripidae
Thrips genera